Okemah and the Melody of Riot is the fourth album by alt-country band Son Volt. It was released on October 5, 2005.

Reception

The album has a score of 72 out of 100 from Metacritic, indicating "generally favorable reviews". Trouser Press gave the album a very favorable review and called it "A stunning return to form." The A.V. Club gave it a favorable review and said of Jay Farrar, "Even when his overintellectualized lyrics smear into a palette of industrial gray, the guitars provide a strong human heartbeat." NME gave it a score of seven out of ten and said that "Farrar has the passion to carry the songs beyond any hackneyed themes."  Other reviews are average or mixed: Mojo gave the album three stars out of five and said, "By focusing on the temporal, [Farrar] reduces himself to simple protest music rather than timeless folk." The New York Times gave it an average review and said, "The band's underlying, stubborn seriousness, and nearly Amish unwillingness to change, creates its appeal." Blender, however, gave it two stars out of five and said that Farrar had "never tried so actively to fuse prescriptive politics into [the] mix, and the move feels suspect."

Track listing
All songs written by Jay Farrar. 
"Bandages & Scars" – 3:23
"Afterglow 61" – 2:48
"Jet Pilot" – 3:12
"Atmosphere" – 3:50
"Ipecac" – 3:29
"Who" – 4:02
"Endless War" – 4:25
"Medication" – 5:00
"6 String Belief" – 3:16
"Gramophone" – 3:09
"Chaos Streams" – 3:52
"World Waits for You" – 4:08
"World Waits for You (Reprise)" – 1:56

Personnel
 Jay Farrar - vocals, guitar, piano, harmonica
 Dave Bryson - drums
 Andrew DuPlantis - bass, backing vocals
 Brad Rice - guitar
 Eric Heywood - pedal steel guitar on "World Waits for You"
 John Horton - electric slide guitar on "World Waits for You (Reprise)"
 Mark Spencer - slide guitar and slide dulcimer on "Medication"; backing vocal on "Who"; organ on "Gramophone"

References

External links
 

2005 albums
Son Volt albums